Mazin Abdellah Hilal Al Farrayeh (born 1969) is the Jordanian Minister of Interior. He was appointed as minister on 7 March 2020.

Education 
Al Farrayeh holds a Bachelor in Public Administration and a Bachelor in Military Sciences from Mutah University. In addition, he holds a Master in Military Sciences from Mubarak al-Abdullah Joint Command and Staff College and a Master in Strategic Studies from the United States Army War College.

References 

1969 births
21st-century Jordanian politicians
Government ministers of Jordan
Interior ministers of Jordan
Living people